Erik Breukink (born 1 April 1964) is a former Dutch professional road racing cyclist. In 1988, Breukink won the youth competition in the Tour de France. In 1990, finished 3rd in the 1990 Tour de France. Most recently, he served as the manager of the  team.

Biography

Amateur cycling years
Born in Rheden, Breukink was born in a cycling family, as his father Willem Breukink was director of the Gazelle bicycle factory. Despite this, he chose to be a footballer. In 1980 he changed to pursue a cycling career. In 1982, this appeared to be a good choice, when he won the Dutch national pursuit championship for juniors. At the 1984 Olympic Games, Erik Breukink competed with Gert Jakobs, Maarten Ducrot and Jos Alberts in the 100 km Team Pursuit and finish fourth place. In 1985, Breukink won 2 time trial stages in Olympia's Tour, and finished 3rd place overall. He decided to switch to a professional career.

Professional cycling years

Breukink made his debut as a pro in 1986 for the Skala-Gazelle team. He turned out to be a time trial specialist and was a good climber. In his Tour de France debut in 1987, he won one stage and finished second in the young rider classification. His real breakthrough in the major courses was the 1988 Giro d'Italia, where he debuted with a 2nd place, winning the Gavia Pass stage in a snowstorm.  In the 1988 Tour de France he won the young rider classification and finished 13th place. In the 1989 Tour de France, he showed his time trial skills by winning the prologue, and wearing the yellow jersey for one day. In that year's Giro d'Italia, he almost won, but lost the lead in the Dolomites due to hunger.
In 1990, Breukink wanted to focus on the Tour de France, so he switched to the PDM team, that allowed him to do so. In the 1990 Tour de France, the result was good, winning two stages and finishing 3rd overall. The result could even have been better, but Breukink suffered from some bad luck: in the climb to the Tourmalet Breukink had to switch bicycles three times.
In 1991, Breukink together with the entire PDM-team had to leave the tour ranked 3rd, officially due to food poisoning, but it was later exposed that it was due to Intralipid. 
In 1992, he appeared weak, especially in his favourite time trials. In 1993, Breukink switched to the  team, where his performance improved again. Bad luck followed him however, as just before the start of the 1993 Tour de France, he was hit by a car test riding the new Lotus 110. The damage to his left knee caused him to give up during the Tour.
Breukink rode the Tour de France four times afterwards, but never reached his old level. In 1997 he ended his professional cycling career, having ridden 11 Tours de France and won 4 stages.  He garnered 61 career victories in total.

Sports commentator
After one year as a Public Relations officer for the Rabobank-team, Breukink started as co-commentator for the NOS, covering the Tour de France. In 2002 and 2003, the GP Erik Breukink, a UCI level 2.3 course, was run, with Erik Dekker and Fabian Cancellara as winners, but it was discontinued in 2004 due to financial problems.

Team manager
On 13 January 2004, it was announced that Erik Breukink started as a team manager for the  team. Thanks to his ONCE-years, Erik Breukink speaks Spanish fluently, which is helpful to communicate with the Spanish cyclists in the Rabobank team and cyclist Denis Menchov, who also speaks Spanish better than English. Since Breukink became team manager, the Rabobank cycling team's successes have included Paris–Tours, Milan–San Remo, the Brabantse Pijl (3×), the Tirreno–Adriatico (2×), the Tour de Romandie, the final classification and three stages in the Vuelta a España, 6 stages in the Tour de France and the mountains classification (2×) in the Tour de France.
On, 20 July 2006, Breukink received the "médaille de la fidélité" from the Tour de France organisation, because he had been present in the Tour de France for 20 years. (11 times as rider, 1 time as PR-officer, 5 times as sports commentator and 3 times as team manager).

Career achievements

Major results

1982
 1st  Team pursuit, National Track Championships
1984
 3rd Overall Olympia's Tour
1st Stage 7a
1985
 Olympia's Tour
1st Prologue & Stage 7a
 1st Stage 4b Tour de Liège
1986
 1st Stage 4 Tour de Suisse
1987
 1st Stage 13 Tour de France
 3rd Overall Giro d'Italia
1st Stage 1a
Held  after Stages 1a–2
Held  after Stages 1a–3
Held  after Stages 1a & 1b
 4th Grand Prix Eddy Merckx
 4th Circuit des Frontières
 6th Nokere Koerse
1988
 1st  Overall Tour of the Basque Country
1st Stages 5a & 5b (ITT)
 1st  Overall Critérium International
1st Stage 3 (ITT)
 1st Omloop van het Waasland
 Tour de France
1st  Young rider classification
1st Stage 2 (TTT)
 2nd Overall Giro d'Italia
1st Stage 14
 2nd Overall Ronde van Nederland
1989
 1st  Overall Escalada a Montjuïc
1st Stages 1a & 1b (ITT)
 Tour de Romandie
1st Prologue & Stage 4b
 Tour de France
1st Prologue
Held  &  after Prologue
 1st Stage 6b (ITT) Volta a Catalunya
 4th Overall Giro d'Italia
Held  after Stages 8 & 10–13
 7th Overall Nissan Classic
 9th Milano–Torino
1990
 1st  Overall Nissan Classic
1st Stage 2a (ITT)
 1st Stage 4 (ITT)  Tour de Suisse
 1st Stage 8 (ITT) Tirreno–Adriatico
 1st Stage 7a (ITT) Volta a Catalunya
 1st Stage 1b (ITT) Vuelta a Asturias
 1st Grand Prix de la Libération (TTT)
 2nd Overall Ronde van Nederland
 3rd Overall Tour de France
1st Stages 12 (ITT) & 20 (ITT)
 3rd Overall Tour DuPont
 10th Overall Tour of the Basque Country
1991
 1st  Overall Tour DuPont
1st Prologue & Stage 11
 1st Grand Prix Eddy Merckx
 1st Stage 8  (ITT) Tirreno–Adriatico
 2nd Grand Prix des Nations
 3rd Overall Escalada a Montjuïc
 3rd Overall Vuelta a Asturias
 3rd Road race, National Road Championships
 5th Overall Critérium International
1992
 1st Giro del Piemonte
 Tirreno–Adriatico
1st Prologue & 7 (ITT)
 1st Stage 7  (ITT) Vuelta a España
 2nd Overall Volta a la Comunitat Valenciana
 3rd Road race, National Road Championships
 6th Overall Ronde van Nederland
 7th Overall Tour de France
 7th Overall Tour de Suisse
 8th Overall Tour of the Basque Country
1993
 1st  Road race, National Road Championships
 1st  Overall Critérium International
1st Stage 3 (ITT)
 1st  Overall Ronde van Nederland
1st Stage 3b (ITT)
 1st  Overall Vuelta a Asturias
1st Stage 1
 1st Stage 2 Volta a la Comunitat Valenciana
 4th La Flèche Wallonne
 5th Overall Paris–Nice
 7th Overall Vuelta a España
 8th Overall Tour of the Basque Country
1994
 4th Time trial, UCI Road World Championships
 8th Overall Volta a Catalunya
 8th Overall Ronde van Nederland
1995
 1st  Time trial, National Road Championships
 2nd Overall Vuelta a Murcia
 2nd Subida a Urkiola
 4th Overall Critérium International
 5th Overall Ronde van Nederland
 6th Time trial, UCI Road World Championships
1996
 1st Druivenkoers Overijse
 3rd Overall Tour de Luxembourg
 7th Overall Ronde van Nederland
1997
 National Road Championships
1st  Time trial
2nd Road race
 3rd Overall Tour de Luxembourg
 5th Overall Ronde van Nederland
 5th Grand Prix des Nations
 7th Time trial, UCI Road World Championships

Grand Tour general classification results timeline

See also
 List of Dutch Olympic cyclists
 List of Dutch cyclists who have led the Tour de France general classification

References

External links

 

1964 births
Living people
People from Rheden
Cyclists at the 1984 Summer Olympics
Cyclists at the 1996 Summer Olympics
Dutch male cyclists
Dutch Tour de France stage winners
Olympic cyclists of the Netherlands
Tour de France prologue winners
Dutch Vuelta a España stage winners
Cycling announcers
Dutch Giro d'Italia stage winners
Tour de Suisse stage winners
Dutch cycling time trial champions
UCI Road World Championships cyclists for the Netherlands
Cyclists from Gelderland